The First National Government of New Zealand was the government of New Zealand from 1949 to 1957 formed by the National Party. It was a conservative government best remembered for its role in the 1951 waterfront dispute. It also began the repositioning of New Zealand in the cold war environment. Although New Zealand continued to assist Britain in situations such as the Malayan Emergency, it now became connected to Australia and the United States through the ANZUS agreement.

Domestically, the First National Government presided over a steady rise in the average standard of living, and by 1957 New Zealand was, in the words of the historian Keith Sinclair, "a materialist's paradise." In 1957, the National Party published a book entitled "A Record of Achievement: The Work of the National Government, 1949–1957,” detailing its accomplishments in office. Under National's leadership, according to the publication, people now had more money, pensions, cattle, sheep, university scholarships, overseas trips, radios, washing machines, vacuum cleaners, electric toasters, houses, motor vehicles, and telephones. As summed up by Sidney Holland in a foreword, 'New Zealand is a happier, healthier and more prosperous nation'.

Significant policies

Constitutional
 Abolished the Legislative Council (Upper House), thus making New Zealand's parliament unicameral; see Suicide squad.
 Established the position of Deputy Prime Minister.

Industrial
 Took the side of employers in the 1951 waterfront dispute

Economic
 Post-war rationing and price controls on property abolished.
 Producer-controlled export boards created.
 Set up PAYE income tax.
 Formed a partnership with Fletcher Construction to build a pulp and paper mill at Kawerau.

Foreign affairs and military
This period marked a shift in New Zealand's foreign policy. Before World War II New Zealand lacked an independent foreign policy, instead opting to simply follow and support Britain. New Zealand's participation in World War II was part of this – Prime Minister Michael Joseph Savage had declared that 'where Britain goes we go', and New Zealand troops had fought almost exclusively in Europe rather than in the Pacific, where Japanese forces threatened New Zealand. At the start of the war it had been assumed that the Royal Navy would protect New Zealand, but the Fall of Singapore showed this to be a false assumption. New Zealand turned to the United States for protection. The beginning of the Cold War, and communist successes in China made many New Zealanders feel in need of this protection. New Zealand therefore entered the ANZUS pact with Australia and the United States, each pledging to defend the others if they were attacked. Fear of the communist threat from Asia also motivated the introduction of compulsory military training and New Zealand's participation in the Korean War and the Malayan Emergency. However, there was still considerable support for Britain, which led to New Zealand giving Britain moral support (but no practical help) during the Suez Crisis.

Social policy
The government maintained the welfare state created by the previous, Labour, government due to its popularity with voters. However some modifications were made, such as allowing state housing tenants to purchase their homes and enabling families to capitalise their family benefits to buy a house. In 1950, the suspensory loan was introduced, a subsidy towards the construction of a home which was repayable if the house was sold within seven years.

The Lead Process Regulations, issued the same year, were aimed at safeguarding factory workers "whose work brings them into contact in any way with lead or compounds containing over a specified proportion of lead."

A year later, universal superannuation was doubled, and a noncontributory social assistance scheme for the underprivileged was introduced. In 1954, widows' benefit was extended to deserted wives after divorce in some cases.

Formation

The National Party was formed in 1936, after the Labour Party took office for the first time, displacing the Liberal-Reform coalition. The Liberal and Reform parties (along with the Country Party) officially merged into the National Party, initially basing themselves on opposition to Labour and its welfare state policies. However the popularity of these policies soon became evident, and National began to moderate its opposition, promising that it would not abolish the welfare system Labour had enacted.

By 1949, Labour had been in power for 14 years. Labour's interventionist ethos combined with the economic restrictions caused by World War II meant that the economy was highly regulated and consumer choice limited. National campaigned on the promise that it would keep the overall structure of Labour's welfare state while moderating it to reduce the power of trade unions, increase consumer choice and generally abolish unnecessary regulation. On a relatively small swing, National gained eight seats and became the government for the first time.

The 1951 election

This was a snap election called after the 1951 waterfront dispute. The dispute was an industrial conflict between the dockworkers' (watersiders') union and the Waterfront Industry Commission, representing employers. Union members had refused to do overtime and had been locked out of the wharves. The dispute lasted from February to July – 151 days. During this time the army was brought in to work the wharves. Prime Minister Sidney Holland argued that militant unions should not be allowed to disrupt the shipping of New Zealand's vital agricultural exports, and the government enacted a range of drastic measures aimed at crushing the union. It was illegal to publish anything in support of the union, or to provide food or other support for the watersiders. The Labour opposition equivocated on the issue, with leader Walter Nash annoying both sides by saying he was 'neither for nor against' the watersiders. The 1951 election was called to provide the government with a mandate for its actions during the strike. This was a successful move, as the government was returned with an increased majority.

The 1954 election

Although National's share of the vote declined significantly from its 1951 levels, it was able to retain its hold on government. This was primarily because both it and Labour had lost votes to the new Social Credit party. With the economy booming, National campaigned on a platform of 'steady as she goes' – simply maintaining the status quo.

Defeat

The major issue in this election was the introduction of PAYE (pay as you earn) income tax. Although both parties were committed to the introduction of the system, they differed in terms of how the changeover from the previous system would be managed. National proposed a complicated rebate system while Labour simply promised a £100 rebate for all taxpayers on the commencement of the new system. Although denounced by National as a bribe, Labour's proposal was the more popular. In addition, National was suffering from leadership problems. Holland appeared old and frail, even compared to Labour leader Walter Nash, who was actually eleven years older. Holland was persuaded to step down from the leadership in favour of Keith Holyoake, but the transition occurred too close to the election, and Holyoake had little time to establish his leadership. Labour was able to win 4% more of the vote than National, and a slender two seat majority.

Election results

Prime ministers
Sidney Holland was the Prime Minister for most of the government's term, from 13 December 1949. On 20 September 1957 – less than three months before the election – he stepped down in favour of Keith Holyoake, who was only Prime Minister to 12 December 1957.

Cabinet Ministers

Further reading

See also
Governments of New Zealand
New Zealand National Party

References

Ministries of George VI
Ministries of Elizabeth II
National 1
New Zealand National Party
20th century in New Zealand
1949 establishments in New Zealand
1957 disestablishments in New Zealand
Cabinets established in 1949
Cabinets disestablished in 1957